Chorlton is a civil parish in the Borough of Cheshire West and Chester and ceremonial county of Cheshire, England. Situated to the west of the market town of Malpas, the main settlement in the parish is Chorlton Lane. Local landmarks Chorlton Hall (Grade II) and Chorlton Old Hall (Grade II*) are both listed buildings. 

In the 2001 census the civil parish had a population of 68, 
increasing to 124 at the 2011 census.

See also

Listed buildings in Chorlton, Cheshire West and Chester
Chorlton-by-Backford

References

External links

Villages in Cheshire
Civil parishes in Cheshire